Murzasichle  is a village in the administrative district of Gmina Poronin, within Tatra County, Lesser Poland Voivodeship, in southern Poland.

The village has a population of 1,100. Its name came from the merging of the names of two settlements: Mur and Zasichle. The village is a part of the Podhale region and is inhabited by Gorals.

References

Villages in Tatra County